The 1902 New Hampshire football team was an American football team that represented New Hampshire College of Agriculture and the Mechanic Arts during the 1902 college football season—the school became the University of New Hampshire in 1923. The team finished with a record of 2–3–1, under direction of the program's first head coach, John Scannell.

Schedule
Scoring during this era awarded five points for a touchdown, one point for a conversion kick (extra point), and five points for a field goal. Teams played in the one-platoon system and the forward pass was not yet legal. Games were played in two halves rather than four quarters.

The New Hampshire College Monthly is clear that the Boston College game was played on Saturday, October 25, in Dover; College Football Data Warehouse and the University's media guide list the game as having been played on October 24 in Durham.

In addition to the varsity games listed above, New Hampshire's second team (reserves) lost to the Exeter Academy second team, 5–0, and defeated a team of Exeter Academy seniors, 32–6.

Notes

References

Further reading
 

New Hampshire
New Hampshire Wildcats football seasons
New Hampshire football